Lotus Lake Wetland Park is a park located in Fanhe Town, Tieling, Liaoning, China. The wetland park mainly includes Deshengtai Reservoir, Wujiao Lake, Dalianhuapao and Sino-North Korean Friendship Reservoir.  It is a complex wetland mainly composed of artificial ponds, rice paddies, rivers and small, shallow lakes, with a total area of 4,226 hectares.

On April 26, 2007, the National Forestry and Grassland Administration officially approved the pilot project of Lotus Lake National Wetland Park in Tieling.  The Lotus Lake was historically part of the Northeast Wetland, a type of swamp wetland, with a total drainage area of 200 square kilometers.

References

Tieling
Wetlands of China
Parks in Liaoning